Jaisinghpur is a village and tehsil headquarters in Sultanpur district, Uttar Pradesh, India. As of 2011, it has a population of 2,211 people, in 353 households. It has 4 primary schools and one hospital. It hosts a haat on Tuesdays and Saturdays mostly dealing in tat patti. It serves as the headquarters of a nyaya panchayat which also includes 23 other villages. It is also the seat of a community development block, which was inaugurated in 1953.

History
At the turn of the 20th century, Jaisinghpur was described as a poor village, with narrow, twisting streets. It formed part of the taluqdari estate of the Raja of Hasanpur, serving as a tehsil within the estate. It had a small bazar, where a small sugar refining industry took place, but at that time the sugar refiners were struggling because of competition from beet sugar. Jaisinghpur also had a police station and an upper primary school which was not attended by many students. It was connected by a minor rail line to Sultanpur in one direction and Dostpur in the other. As of 1901, Jaisinghpur had a population of 909.

The 1951 census recorded Jaisinghpur (as "Jaisinghpur Kalan") as comprising 2 hamlets, with a total population of 892 people (482 male and 410 female), in 192 households and 180 physical houses. The area of the village was given as 178 acres. 55 residents were literate, all male. The village was listed as belonging to the pargana of Baraunsa and the thana of Jaisinghpur.

The 1961 census recorded Jaisinghpur (as "Jaisinghpur Kalan") as comprising 2 hamlets, with a total population of 1,001 people (524 male and 477 female), in 238 households and 215 physical houses. The area of the village was given as 183 acres and it had a medical practitioner, maternity and child welfare centre, and post office at that point. Its police force consisted of 2 sub-inspectors, 1 head constable, and 14 constables. Average attendance of the twice-weekly haat was about 150 people.

The 1981 census recorded Jaisinghpur as having a population of 1,360 people, in 252 households, and having an area of 72.04 hectares. The main staple foods were listed as wheat and rice.

The 1991 census recorded Jaisinghpur as having a total population of 1,610 people (838 male and 772 female), in 235 households and 234 physical houses. The area of the village was listed as 72.04 hectares. Members of the 0-6 age group numbered 290, or 18% of the total; this group was 46% male (132) and 54% female (158). Members of scheduled castes numbered 374, or 23% of the village's total population, while no members of scheduled tribes were recorded. The literacy rate of the village was 41.5% (289 men and 259 women, counting only people age 7 and up). 362 people were classified as main workers (359 men and 3 women), while 0 people were classified as marginal workers; the remaining 1,248 residents were non-workers. The breakdown of main workers by employment category was as follows: 139 cultivators (i.e. people who owned or leased their own land); 105 agricultural labourers (i.e. people who worked someone else's land in return for payment); 0 workers in livestock, forestry, fishing, hunting, plantations, orchards, etc.; 0 in mining and quarrying; 34 household industry workers; 1 worker employed in other manufacturing, processing, service, and repair roles; 0 construction workers; 21 employed in trade and commerce; 1 employed in transport, storage, and communications; and 61 in other services.

Villages
Jaisinghpur CD block has the following 177 villages:

References

Villages in Sultanpur district